David Griffith is an American politician currently serving in the Missouri House of Representatives from Missouri's 60th district. He won the seat after defeating Democrat Sara Michael 57.7% to 42.3%.

Electoral History

References 

Republican Party members of the Missouri House of Representatives
21st-century American politicians
Living people
Year of birth missing (living people)